"Kevin Carter" is a song by Manic Street Preachers, released as the third single from their album Everything Must Go in 1996. The song peaked at number nine on the UK Singles Chart.

Background and composition

The subject of the lyric was the 1994 Pulitzer Prize-winning professional photographer Kevin Carter who was awarded for his image The Vulture and the Little Girl, taken in what is now South Sudan. Carter was troubled by the balance of his professional responsibilities with moral considerations, leading to his suicide by carbon monoxide poisoning at the age of 33.

The song's unusual feel can be attributed in part to the track being composed in open G tuning (as opposed to standard guitar tuning), which is commonly used in the playing of slide and bottleneck guitars. On the record, however, it is played with a Fender Jazzmaster.

The jagged, descending chords of the verses lead into a lush extended middle section, which further points to experimental songwriting while also linking back to the spiky music on the band's previous album, The Holy Bible. James Dean Bradfield has said of the song, "It's quite a scratchy sound, but it's kind of complicated in its own humble way."

Along with "Elvis Impersonator: Blackpool Pier", it was one of two new tracks that he played on an acoustic guitar to the songs' lyricist, Richey Edwards, shortly before he disappeared.

Release
The song reached number nine on the UK Singles Chart on 12 October 1996, giving them a third straight top-ten hit, remaining in the charts for eight weeks. The song's lyrics were written solely by missing band-member Richey Edwards. The trumpet solo played by Sean Moore, has been used as the theme music to the ITV Wales current affairs programme Wales This Week.

The CD included "Horses Under Starlight", "Sepia" and "First Republic", while the cassette included an acoustic version of "Everything Must Go".

The second of the three other tracks, "Sepia", is a reference to the final scene of the film, Butch Cassidy and the Sundance Kid, where the two main characters are shown in freeze frame, which then is colourised to sepia tone. The lyrics also appear to reflect some of Nicky Wire's raw emotion following the disappearance of his close friend and bandmate.

The Butch Cassidy connection is also referenced in their song "Australia" (which is where the characters from the film say they will go next, directly before the 'Sepia' sequence), and the decision to record "Raindrops Keep Fallin' on My Head" for the War Child charity compilation The Help Album. This track was replaced by a single release of the track "Further Away" in Japan.

Track listings
All music was written by James Dean Bradfield, Sean Moore, and Nicky Wire except where indicated. All lyrics were written by Richey James except where indicated.

CD one
 "Kevin Carter" – 3:28
 "Horses Under Starlight" – 3:09 (Instrumental)
 "Sepia" (music: Bradfield, Moore. lyrics: Wire) – 3:54
 "First Republic" (music: Bradfield, Moore. lyrics: Wire) – 3:48

CD two
 "Kevin Carter" – 3:26
 "Kevin Carter" (Busts Loose) – 7:45 (Remixed by Jon Carter)
 "Kevin Carter" (Stealth Sonic Orchestra Remix) – 6:40
 "Kevin Carter" (Stealth Sonic Orchestra Soundtrack) – 6:37

Cassette
 "Kevin Carter"
 "Everything Must Go" (acoustic version) (music: Bradfield, Moore. lyrics: Wire) Epic 663775 4

Charts

References

Sources
 
 

1996 singles
1996 songs
Epic Records singles
Cultural depictions of photographers
Manic Street Preachers songs
Song recordings produced by Mike Hedges
Songs about suicide
Commemoration songs
Songs written by James Dean Bradfield
Songs written by Nicky Wire
Songs written by Richey Edwards
Songs written by Sean Moore (musician)